"Querer Mejor" is a song by Colombian musician Juanes featuring Canadian singer Alessia Cara. It was released as a single by Universal Music Latino on 24 May 2019. The song was written by Juanes, Cara, Rafa Arcaute, Tainy, Mau y Ricky and Camilo. The song reached number one in Colombia, El Salvador, Nicaragua and Panama, as well as the top 10 in Costa Rica, Ecuador and Guatemala.

Background and promotion
Juanes revealed the song name and release date on May 21, 2019. The song was Alessia Cara's first Spanish release.

Reception
NPRs Felix Contreras called the song "classic Juanes, a slow-burning ballad that celebrates commitment and enduring love". Writing for Forbes, Jeff Benjamin stated that it "boasts the rock sound that Juanes has carried throughout his career with a thumping dembow-inspired beat backing their harmonies reflecting on a how to be better lovers". Rolling Stone's Suzy Exposito stated that "Querer Mejor" is "guided by a fluid dembow rhythm, flutters of guitar and a Hammond organ", and that the two singers "make a stunning rapport" in it. The song received nominations for a Latin Grammy Award for Record of the Year and Song of the Year in 2019.

Music video
The music video for "Querer Mejor" preceded the song's digital release by one day, premiering on May 23, 2019.

Charts

Certifications

References

2019 singles
2019 songs
Juanes songs
Alessia Cara songs
Spanish-language songs
Songs written by Juanes
Songs written by Alessia Cara
Songs written by Tainy
Songs written by Camilo (singer)
Songs written by Ricardo Montaner
Songs written by Mau Montaner